Timothy Stephen Wakefield (born August 2, 1966) is an American former professional baseball pitcher who played 19 seasons in Major League Baseball (MLB). Wakefield began his career with the Pittsburgh Pirates, but is most remembered for his 17-year tenure with the Boston Red Sox, from 1995 until his retirement in 2012 as the longest-serving player on the team. When he retired, Wakefield was the oldest active player in the major leagues.

Wakefield won his 200th career game on September 13, 2011, against the Toronto Blue Jays, and he ranks third in career wins in Red Sox franchise history (186), behind Cy Young and Roger Clemens. He is second in all-time wins at Fenway Park with 97, behind Clemens's 100, and is the all-time leader in innings pitched by a Red Sox pitcher, with 3,006, having surpassed Clemens's total of 2,777 on June 8, 2010.

Wakefield was nominated eight times for the Roberto Clemente Award, winning it in 2010.

Early life
Wakefield was born in Melbourne, Florida, on August 2, 1966. He attended Eau Gallie High School and then attended Florida Tech. At Florida Tech, he was named the Panthers' team MVP as a first baseman in his sophomore and junior years. He set single-season records with 22 home runs, as well as the career home run record at 40. In 2006, his number 3 was retired by the college.

Professional career

Pittsburgh Pirates
Wakefield was drafted as a first baseman in 1988 by the Pittsburgh Pirates. After a scout told him that he would never get above Double-A ball as a position player with his skills, Wakefield began developing the knuckleball that has made him so well-known, at the time stating, "I just want to be able to say I tried everything I could to make it."

The following season, Wakefield made his professional pitching debut while playing for the Single-A Salem Buccaneers. His immediate success led to a full conversion to pitcher in 1990, and he led the Carolina League in starts and innings pitched. Wakefield advanced to Double-A in 1991 and continued to improve, leading all Pirates minor leaguers in wins, innings pitched, and complete games when he went 15–8 with a 2.90 ERA.

1992–1994
In 1992, Wakefield began the season with the Triple-A Buffalo Bisons of the American Association. He registered a league-high six complete games by July 31—winning 10 games with a 3.06 ERA—and was called up to the majors. In his major league debut, Wakefield threw a complete game against the St. Louis Cardinals, striking out 10 batters while throwing 146 pitches.

Down the stretch, Wakefield provided a boost for the playoff-bound Pirates, starting 13 games and compiling an 8–1 record with a 2.15 ERA, a performance that won him the National League Rookie Pitcher of the Year Award from The Sporting News. After winning the National League East division, the Pirates faced the Atlanta Braves in the National League Championship Series. Wakefield won both of his starts against Braves star Tom Glavine, throwing a complete game five-hitter in Game 3 of the NLCS and another complete game in Game 6 on three days' rest. With the Pirates leading the Braves in Game 7, Wakefield was poised to be named NLCS MVP until the Braves rallied for three runs in the bottom of the ninth off Stan Belinda.

During the first month of the 1993 season, Wakefield walked nine batters twice and ten in another start. After losing his spot in the starting rotation, Wakefield was sent down to Double-A. He was recalled in September and struggled again, but finished the season with two straight shutouts.

Wakefield spent most of 1994 with Triple-A Buffalo. He led the league in losses, walks, and home runs allowed. Wakefield was recalled to the Pirates in September but he did not play due to the players strike. The Pirates released Wakefield on April 20, 1995.

Boston Red Sox
Six days after being released from the Pirates, Wakefield was signed by the Boston Red Sox. He worked with Phil and Joe Niekro, two former knuckleballers, who encouraged him to use the knuckleball as an out pitch. In Triple-A Pawtucket, Wakefield went 2–1 with a 2.53 ERA.

1995–1998

With the Boston Red Sox rotation struggling from injuries to top of the rotation starters Roger Clemens and Aaron Sele early in the 1995 season, Wakefield was called up from Triple-A, and soon proved to be their most dependable starter. He began the season with a 1.65 ERA and a 14–1 record through 17 games, six of which were complete games. He ended the year 16–8 with a 2.95 ERA, helping the Red Sox win the American League East division title, and capturing the Sporting News American League Comeback Player of the Year. He finished third in the AL Cy Young Award balloting.

Over the next three seasons (1996–1998), Wakefield won 45 games and had ERAs of 5.14, 4.25 and 4.58 over the three seasons as a starter. In 1997, he led Major League Baseball by hitting 16 batters with a pitch. He would repeat this feat in 2001 plunking a career-high 18 batters.

1999–2002
In 1999, Boston's closer Tom Gordon was injured and manager Jimy Williams installed Wakefield as the new closer during the middle part of the season. On August 10, 1999, he joined a select group of pitchers who have struck out four batters in one inning. Because the fluttering knuckleball produces many passed balls, several knuckleballers share this honor with him. He recorded 15 saves before Derek Lowe emerged as the new closer and Wakefield returned to the starting rotation.

Because of his success out of the bullpen, Wakefield was regularly moved from the position of relief pitcher to starter and back again over the next three seasons (2000–2002). After being moved back into the rotation in late July 2002, Wakefield became a permanent regular starter.

2003–2008
In the 2003 ALCS, Wakefield allowed four runs over 14 innings against the New York Yankees. He started Games 1 and 4 of the Series against Mike Mussina and won both starts. He was also called in to pitch in extra innings of Game 7, after the Yankees tied the game. The Red Sox had been leading 5–2 in the eighth inning. After retiring the side in order in the 10th, Wakefield gave up a home run to Aaron Boone on his first pitch of the 11th, sending the Yankees to the World Series. Wakefield apologized to fans after the game.

In 2004, Wakefield helped the Red Sox win the ALCS against the Yankees, a best-of-seven series to advance to the World Series. The Red Sox lost the first two games of the ALCS and were losing badly in Game 3 when Wakefield asked to be put into the game to save the other pitchers for the next day. He pitched  innings which prevented him from starting Game 4. Derek Lowe started Game 4 in his place which the Red Sox ultimately won. In Game 5, Wakefield again pitched out of the bullpen and was the winning pitcher in a 14-inning game, throwing three shutout innings as the Red Sox won 5–4. The Red Sox beat the Yankees and went on to the World Series. He pitched Game 1 of the 2004 World Series, but did not get a decision as Boston defeated the Cardinals, 11–9, which was the highest-scoring Game 1 in World Series history. The Red Sox swept the Cardinals for their first World Series title in 86 years.

On April 19, 2005, Wakefield agreed to a $4 million, one-year "rolling" contract extension that gave the Red Sox the ability to keep Wakefield for the rest of his career. In the 2005 season, Wakefield led the Red Sox pitching staff with 16 wins and a 4.15 ERA. On September 11, 2005, he set a career high in strikeouts (12) in a 1–0 complete game loss to the New York Yankees.

In 2007, he finished the season with a 17–12 record but was left off the Red Sox roster for the World Series due to an injured shoulder that had been bothering him since late September.

The 12 passed balls while he was pitching topped the majors in 2008.

2009
Wakefield entered his 15th season with the Boston Red Sox in 2009. On April 15, 2009, a day after the Red Sox bullpen was tasked with pitching over 11 innings of relief, Wakefield told Terry Francona: "I understand the circumstances and I just wanted you to know: Whatever happens, don't take me out; let me keep going." He went on to carry a no-hitter into the eighth inning, and earned a complete-game win. At 42, this made him the oldest Red Sox pitcher to pitch a complete game, a record he would break himself in his next start when he pitched a second consecutive complete game win, this time in a seven-inning, rain-shortened game.

Wakefield led the team with a 10–3 record through June 27. With his start on July 3, 2009, Wakefield surpassed Roger Clemens for the most starts in franchise history. His success on the mound had him atop the major leagues with 10 wins at the time of the 2009 All-Star selection. On July 5, 2009, he was announced as an AL All-Star, making him the second-oldest first-time All-Star at 42, behind only Satchel Paige who was 45. By the All-Star break, Wakefield possessed a major league-best 11–3 record. Wakefield did not see action in St. Louis, as he was not needed by Joe Maddon. On July 21, Wakefield was placed on the disabled list due to a lower back strain. He made his next start on August 26 against the Chicago White Sox, pitching seven innings while allowing one earned run to earn a no decision.

2010
Wakefield entered his 16th season with the Boston Red Sox in 2010. He began the year in the starting rotation until Daisuke Matsuzaka came off the disabled list. He later rejoined the rotation due to an injury to Josh Beckett. On May 12, Wakefield recorded his 2,000th career strikeout against Vernon Wells of the Toronto Blue Jays in a 3–2 loss. He joined Jamie Moyer, Javier Vázquez, and Andy Pettitte as the only active pitchers with at least 2,000 career strikeouts. On June 8, Wakefield passed Roger Clemens for the most innings pitched by a Red Sox pitcher. He went on to win that game 3–2 over the Cleveland Indians. On June 13, Wakefield joined Moyer and Pettitte as the only active pitchers with 3,000 innings pitched. He accomplished this feat by retiring Shane Victorino of the Philadelphia Phillies on a fly ball to left. On July 2, he surpassed Clemens for another record, this for starts at Fenway; he went eight innings to win 3–2 over the Baltimore Orioles.

On September 8, against the Tampa Bay Rays, he became the oldest Red Sox pitcher ever to win a game; he is also the oldest player to appear in a game for the Red Sox at Fenway.

On October 28, before Game 2 of the 2010 World Series, Wakefield received the Roberto Clemente Award.

2011
Wakefield's 2011 season was followed in the documentary film Knuckleball! Wakefield started his seventeenth season in a Red Sox uniform as a reliever. Injuries to John Lackey and Daisuke Matsuzaka moved him into the starting rotation.

On May 11, 2011, Wakefield pitched  innings in relief as the Toronto Blue Jays defeated the Red Sox 9–3 at the Rogers Centre. He became, at 44 years, 282 days, the oldest player ever to appear for the Red Sox. At the All-Star break, Wakefield had a 5–3 record with a 4.74 ERA. On July 24, 2011, while pitching against the Seattle Mariners, Wakefield recorded his 2,000th strikeout in a Red Sox uniform against Mike Carp. He also recorded his 199th career win in that game.

It took Wakefield eight attempts to earn his 200th career win after his 199th, finally doing so in an 18–6 rout over the Toronto Blue Jays at Fenway Park on September 13, 2011. The victory came at a time when the Red Sox were in dire need of wins, with the Tampa Bay Rays gaining substantial ground in the race for the American League wild card as Boston fell four games behind the New York Yankees in the AL East division standings. Boston eventually missed the playoffs by one game, and Wakefield ended the season at 7–8 with a 5.12 ERA.

For the 2012 season, Wakefield was offered a minor league contract, with an invitation to spring training, by the Red Sox. Wakefield announced his retirement on February 17, 2012.

Wakefield finished his Red Sox career third in wins (behind Roger Clemens and Cy Young), second in strikeouts (behind Clemens), second in game appearances by a pitcher (behind reliever Bob Stanley), first in games started as a pitcher, and first in innings pitched. His 4.41 career ERA is the highest among all major league pitchers with at least 200 wins.

Playing style

Pitching style

Wakefield pitched with what is said to be a slow sidearm motion, but is actually a ¾-overhand motion. This also revealed some of his pitches to hitters, because they could see his hand. Wakefield's primary pitch, the knuckleball, was normally thrown at about 64–68 mph and had a great deal of variance in how much it "fluttered". The flutter of his knuckleball depended on a variety of factors including temperature, humidity, precipitation (both type and intensity), air resistance, wind speed, wind direction, the condition of the ball, and very small changes in his grip or the orientation of the seams. Wakefield also featured a 71–75 mph fastball, a slow curve (57-61 mph), and a slower version of his knuckleball (59-62 mph).

Knuckleball pitchers are traditionally believed to be able to pitch more frequently and for more pitches per game than conventional pitchers. Throughout the first decade of his career, Wakefield followed a similar pattern: on April 27, 1993, he threw 172 pitches over 10+ innings in a game for the Pittsburgh Pirates against the Atlanta Braves. In his first two weeks with the Red Sox, Wakefield pitched a total of  innings, including two complete games in addition to a -inning emergency start on just two days' rest. As late as the 2003 and 2004 ALCS, Wakefield was making relief appearances between starts. In the later years of his career, the Red Sox generally treated Wakefield more like conventional pitchers in terms of pitch count, rarely allowing him to pitch more than about 110 pitches per game, and giving him four days of rest. Also, because of the relatively low wear on their pitching arms, knuckleball pitchers tend to have longer professional careers than most other pitchers.

At the time of his retirement, Wakefield was seventh on the all-time hit batters list.

Catcher
Because of the difficulty of catching a knuckleball, the Red Sox sometimes carried a backup catcher who specialized in defense and who caught most or all of Wakefield's starts. For several years, his personal catcher was Doug Mirabelli, who used a league-approved mitt similar to a softball catcher's mitt for catching Wakefield. Josh Bard briefly caught Wakefield during the first month of the 2006 season, before Boston reacquired Mirabelli on May 1 after trading him to San Diego the previous offseason. Mirabelli was released in the spring of 2008 and Wakefield's catcher was Kevin Cash during 2008. George Kottaras became his personal catcher in 2009. Victor Martinez was acquired by the Red Sox on July 31, 2009, and began catching for Wakefield on August 26, 2009. Martinez experimented catching Wakefield's pitches with various gloves and mitts before settling on a first baseman's mitt. Due to injuries to both Martinez and Jason Varitek, Boston reacquired Kevin Cash from the Houston Astros on July 1, 2010, to serve as Wakefield's catcher as well as the primary catcher. Martinez became Wakefield's catcher once more when he returned. In 2011, Wakefield began the season in the bullpen and both Jarrod Saltalamacchia and Jason Varitek caught him when he entered games. When Wakefield returned to the rotation, Saltalamacchia was the catcher in each game he started.

Batting
Due to the designated hitter rule, Wakefield batted for the Red Sox only when playing in National League parks. While with the Pirates, a National League team, he had a .071 and a .163 batting average in his two years. He hit the only home run of his career in 1993. His career batting average was .117.

Appearances outside of baseball

Philanthropy
Wakefield was well known throughout Major League Baseball as one of its most charitable players. He was nominated eight times by the Red Sox for the Roberto Clemente Award, presented to the player who best reflects the spirit of giving back to the community, winning the award in 2010. Since 1998, Wakefield has partnered with the Franciscan Hospital for Children in Boston to bring patients to Fenway Park to share time with him on and off the field. He has also hosted an annual celebrity golf tournament for 18 years. Wakefield has also been active with New England's Pitching in for Kids organization (a program dedicated to improving the lives of children across the New England region), the Space Coast Early Intervention Center in Melbourne, Florida, and the Touch 'Em All Foundation founded by Garth Brooks.

In 2007, Wakefield released a charity wine called CaberKnuckle, in association with Longball Vineyards, with 100% of the proceeds supporting Pitching in for Kids; the wine raised more than $100,000.

In 2013, the Red Sox named Wakefield Honorary Chairman of the Red Sox Foundation. In that role, Wakefield supports fundraising events, community service days and personal visits.

Broadcasting
In June 2012, Wakefield joined NESN as a studio analyst for Red Sox coverage.

Endorsements
In August 2015, Wakefield signed on as a spokesperson for Farmington Bank by making appearances at branch grand openings and television, radio and print advertisements.

Business interests
Wakefield was part owner of a restaurant in Pembroke, Massachusetts, called Turner's Yard. One of his partners in the restaurant was National Hockey League player Shawn Thornton. The restaurant is now closed.

Personal life
Wakefield became an evangelical Christian after he "accepted Jesus Christ as [his] Lord and savior" in 1990.

Wakefield met his wife, Stacy Stover, in Massachusetts. They were married November 9, 2002. Their two children are Trevor (born in 2004) and Brianna (2005). They own a home in Satellite Beach, Florida.

See also

Boston Red Sox Hall of Fame
List of knuckleball pitchers
List of Major League Baseball career wins leaders
List of Major League Baseball career strikeout leaders
List of Major League Baseball career hit batsmen leaders
List of oldest Major League Baseball players
List of Major League Baseball single-inning strikeout leaders

References

External links

1966 births
Living people
Pittsburgh Pirates players
Boston Red Sox players
American League All-Stars
Baseball players from Florida
Florida Tech Panthers baseball players
Knuckleball pitchers
Major League Baseball pitchers
Watertown Pirates players
Augusta Pirates players
Welland Pirates players
Salem Buccaneers players
Carolina Mudcats players
Buffalo Bisons (minor league) players
Major League Baseball broadcasters
Boston Red Sox announcers
Pawtucket Red Sox players
People from Melbourne, Florida
People from Indian Harbour Beach, Florida
American evangelicals
Converts to evangelical Christianity